Etomami River  is a river in the Canadian province of Saskatchewan. The river originates in the Porcupine Hills and flows northward towards the town of Hudson Bay and into the Red Deer River. "Etomami" is a First Nations word that means "a place that three rivers join." It is in reference to the spot along the Red Deer River where the mouths of the Etomami and Fir Rivers meet the Red Deer River.

Description 
The river begins at the north end of Etomami Lake in the RM of Preeceville No. 334 and flows northward through a deep-cut valley into the RM of Hudson Bay No. 394 following the Canadian National Railway and Highway 9. Its mouth is located on the Red Deer River on the south side of the town of Hudson Bay in the Hudson Bay Regional Park. The regional park itself is the site of an historical North West Company fur trading fort called Fort Red Deer River.

Upstream from the park along the river and Highway 9 is Dagg Creek Recreation Site (52°38′30″N, 102°24′9″W), The site has campsites, picnicking, and access to the river.

Tributaries 
As the Etomami River flows northward, it is joined by several other rivers and creeks.

Etomami River mainstem
Piwei River
Big Valley Creek
Shand Creek
McKillop Creek
Bowman Creek
McNab Creek
Pepaw River
Boundary Creek
Bubbling Creek
Loiselle Creek

Etomami Lake
Etomami Lake (52°15′20″N, 102°39′4″W) is located in a valley in the Porcupine Hills. On the south of the lake is a swampy area that divides the Red Deer River drainage basin and the Assiniboine River drainage basin. On the south side of this swamp is Lilian Lake, which is the source of the Lilian River. The Lilian River is a tributary of the Assiniboine River and this swamp acts as a natural portage between the two drainage basins.

See also 
List of rivers of Saskatchewan
Assiniboine River fur trade
Hudson Bay drainage basin

References 

Rivers of Saskatchewan
Tributaries of Hudson Bay
Hudson Bay No. 394, Saskatchewan
Preeceville No. 334, Saskatchewan
Division No. 14, Saskatchewan